The  is a two-seat carrier-based dive bomber developed by the Yokosuka Naval Air Technical Arsenal and operated by the Imperial Japanese Navy from 1942 to 1945 during World War II. Development of the aircraft began in 1938. The first D4Y1 was complete in November 1940 and made its maiden flight at Yokosuka the following month.

While the aircraft was originally conceived as a dive bomber, the D4Y was used in other roles including reconnaissance, night fighter and special attack (kamikaze). It made its combat debut as a reconnaissance aircraft when two pre-production D4Y1-Cs embarked aboard the Sōryū to take part in the Battle of Midway in 1942. It was not until March 1943 that it was accepted for use as a dive bomber. The early D4Y1 and D4Y2 featured the liquid-cooled Aichi Atsuta engine, a licensed version of the German Daimler-Benz DB 601, while the later D4Y3 and D4Y4 featured the Mitsubishi MK8P Kinsei radial engine.

Like many other Japanese aircraft of the time, the D4Y lacked armor and self-sealing fuel tanks and it was not until the final variant, the D4Y4, that the aircraft was given bulletproof glass and armor protection for the crew and fuel tanks. Nevertheless, the D4Y was one of the fastest dive bombers of the war, particularly the D4Y4 whom Max Gadney said was the "fastest dive-bomber of World War II" and that it was "faster than the Zero" if RATO equipped. Only the delays in its development hindered its service while its predecessor, the slower fixed-gear Aichi D3A, remained in service much longer than intended. Famously, a D4Y was used in one of the final kamikaze attacks in 1945, hours after the surrender of Japan, with Vice Admiral Matome Ugaki in the rear cockpit.

Design and development
Development of the aircraft began in 1938 at the Yokosuka Naval Air Technical Arsenal  when the Imperial Japanese Navy Aviation Bureau (Kaigun Kōkū Hombu) issued requirements of a Navy Experimental 13-Shi Carrier Borne specification for a aircraft carrier-based dive bomber to replace the Aichi D3A. Its design was inspired by the Heinkel He 118 which the Japanese Navy had acquired from Germany in early 1938. The aircraft was a single-engine, all-metal low-wing monoplane, with a wide-track retractable undercarriage and wing-mounted dive brakes. It had a crew of two: a pilot and a navigator/radio-operator/gunner, seated under a long, glazed canopy which provided good all-round visibility. The pilot of bomber versions was provided with a telescopic bombsight. The aircraft was powered by an Aichi Atsuta liquid-cooled inverted V12 engine, a licensed copy of the German Daimler-Benz DB 601, rated at 895 kW (1,200 hp). The radiator was behind and below the three-blade propeller, as in the Curtiss P-40 Warhawk.

The aircraft had a slim fuselage that enabled it to reach high speeds in horizontal flight and in dives, while it had excellent maneuverability despite high wing loading, with the Suisei having superior performance to contemporary dive bombers such as the Curtiss SB2C Helldiver. In order to conform with the Japanese Navy's requirement for long range, weight was minimized by not fitting the D4Y with self-sealing fuel tanks or armour. Subsequently, the D4Y was extremely vulnerable and tended to catch fire when hit.

Bombs were fitted under the wings and in an internal fuselage bomb bay. It usually carried one 500 kg (1,100 lb) bomb but there were reports that the D4Y sometimes carried two 250 kg (550 lb) bombs.} The aircraft was armed with two 7.7 mm (.303 in) Type 97 aircraft machine guns in the nose and a 7.92 mm (.312 in) Type 1 machine gun - selected for its high rate of fire - in the rear of the cockpit. The rear gun was replaced by a 13 mm (.51 in) Type 2 machine gun. This armament was typical for Japanese carrier-based dive-bombers, unlike "carrier attack bombers" (torpedo bombers) like the Nakajima B5N and B6N which were not given forward-firing armament until the late-war Aichi B7A, which was expected to serve as both a dive-bomber and torpedo-bomber, and was given a pair of 20mm Type 99-2 cannon. The forward machine guns were retained in the kamikaze version.

The first (of five) prototypes was complete in November 1940 and made its maiden flight in December 1940. After the prototype trials, problems with flutter were encountered, a fatal flaw for an airframe subject to the stresses of dive bombing. Until this could be resolved, early production aircraft were used as reconnaissance aircraft, as the D4Y1-C, which took advantage of its high speed and long range, while not over-stressing the airframe. Production of the D4Y1-C continued in small numbers until March 1943, when the increasing losses incurred by the D3A resulted in production switching to the D4Y1 dive-bomber, the aircraft's structural problems finally being solved. Although the D4Y could operate from the large fleet carriers that formed the core of the Combined Fleet at the start of the war, it had problems operating from the smaller and slower carriers such as the Hiyō class which formed a large proportion of Japan's carrier fleet after the losses of the Battle of Midway. Catapult equipment was fitted, giving rise to the D4Y1 Kai (or improved) model.

Early versions of the D4Y were difficult to keep operational because the Atsuta engines were unreliable in front-line service. From the beginning, some had argued that the D4Y should be powered by an air-cooled radial engine which Japanese engineers and maintenance crew had experience with, and trusted. The aircraft was re-engined with the reliable Mitsubishi MK8P Kinsei 62, a 14-cylinder two-row radial engine as the Yokosuka D4Y3 Model 33.

These problems were tolerated because of the increased availability of the new variant.

The last version was the D4Y4 Special Strike Bomber, a single-seat kamikaze aircraft, capable of carrying one  bomb, which was put into production in February 1945. It was equipped with three rocket  boosters for terminal dive acceleration. This aircraft was an almost ideal kamikaze model: it had a combination of speed (560 km/h/350 mph), range (2,500 km/1,550 mi) and payload (800 kg/1,760 lb) probably not matched by any other Japanese aircraft.

The D4Y5 Model 54 was a planned version designed in 1945. It was to be powered by the Nakajima NK9C Homare 12 radial engine rated at 1,361 kW (1,825 hp), a new four-blade metal propeller of the constant-speed type and more armour for the crew and fuel tanks. 

Ultimately, 2,038 of all variants were produced, mostly by Aichi.

Operational history

Lacking armor and self-sealing fuel tanks, the Suiseis did not fare well against Allied fighters. They did, however, cause considerable damage to ships, including the carrier  which was nearly sunk by an assumed single D4Y and the light carrier  which was sunk by a single D4Y.

The D4Y1-C reconnaissance aircraft entered service in mid-1942, when two of these aircraft were deployed aboard Sōryū at the Battle of Midway, one of which was lost when Sōryū was bombed. The other had been launched on a scouting mission and returned to Hiryū, it was then lost when Hiryū was bombed.

Marianas
During the Battle of the Marianas, the D4Ys were engaged by U.S. Navy fighters and shot down in large numbers. It was faster than the Grumman F4F Wildcat, but not the new Grumman F6F Hellcat which entered combat in September 1943. The Japanese aircraft were adequate for 1943, but the rapid advances in American materiel in 1944 (among them, the introduction in large numbers of the Essex-class aircraft carrier) left the Japanese behind. Another disadvantage suffered by the Japanese was their inexperienced pilots.

The U.S. Task Force 58 struck the Philippine airfields and destroyed the land air forces first, before engaging Japanese naval aircraft. The result was what the Americans called "The Great Marianas Turkey Shoot", with 400 Japanese aircraft shot down in a single day. A single Hellcat pilot, Lieutenant Alexander Vraciu, shot down six D4Ys within a few minutes.

One D4Y was said to have damaged the battleship .

Leyte and Philippines

The D4Y was relegated to land operations where both the liquid-cooled engine D4Y2, and the radial engine D4Y3 fought against the U.S. fleet, scoring some successes. An unseen D4Y bombed and sank the Princeton on 24 October 1944. D4Ys hit other carriers as well, by both conventional attacks and kamikaze actions. In the Philippines air battles, the Japanese used kamikazes for the first time, and they scored heavily. D4Ys from 761 Kōkūtai may have hit the escort carrier  on 25 October 1944, and the next day, . Both were badly damaged, especially Suwannee, with heavy casualties and many aircraft destroyed. D4Ys also made conventional attacks. All these D4Ys were from 601 and 653 Kōkūtai.

In defense of the homeland
Task Force 58 approached southern Japan in March 1945 to strike military objectives in support of the invasion of Okinawa. The Japanese responded with massive kamikaze attacks, codenamed Kikusui, in which many D4Ys were used.  A dedicated kamikaze version of the D4Y3, the D4Y4 with a non-detachable 800 kg bomb attached in a semi-recessed manner, was developed. The Japanese had begun installing rocket boosters on some Kamikazes, including the D4Y4 in order to increase speed near the target. As the D4Y4 was virtually identical in the air to the D4Y3, it was difficult to determine the sorties of each type.

On 19 March, the carrier  was hit with two bombs from a single D4Y. Franklin was so heavily damaged that she was retired until the end of the war. Another D4Y hit the carrier .

On 12 April 1945, another D4Y, part of Kikusui mission N.2, struck Enterprise, causing some damage.

During Kikusui N.6, on 11 May 1945,  was hit and put out of action by two kamikazes that some sources identify as D4Ys. This was the third Essex-class carrier forced to retire to the United States to repair.

Night fighter
The D4Y was faster than the A6M Zero and some were employed as D4Y2-S night fighters against Boeing B-29 Superfortress bombers late in the war. The night fighter conversions were made at the 11th Naval Aviation Arsenal at Hiro. Each D4Y2-S had its bombing systems and equipment removed, and replaced by a 20 mm Type 99 cannon installed in the rear cockpit, with the barrel slanted up and forwards in a similar manner to the German Schräge Musik armament fitting (pioneered by the IJNAS in May 1943 on the Nakajima J1N). Some examples also carried two or four 10 cm air-to-air rockets under the wings; lack of radar for night interceptions, inadequate climb rate and the B-29's high ceiling limited the D4Y2-S effectiveness as a night fighter. Little is known of their operations.

Last action
At the end of the war, D4Ys were still being used operationally against the U.S. Navy. Among the last of these were 11 aircraft led by Vice Admiral Matome Ugaki on a suicide mission on 15 August 1945, of which all but three were lost.

Operators

 Imperial Japanese Navy Air Service
 Aircraft carrier
 Sōryū, equipped prototype #2 and #3.
 Shōkaku, supplied from 601st Kōkūtai.
 Zuikaku, supplied from 601st Kōkūtai.
 Taihō, supplied from 601st Kōkūtai.
 Jun'yō, supplied from 652nd Kōkūtai.
 Battleship
 Ise, supplied from 634th Kōkūtai.
 Hyūga, supplied from 634th Kōkūtai.
 Naval Air Group
 Himeji Kōkūtai
 Hyakurihara Kōkūtai
 Kaikō Kōkūtai
 Kanoya Kōkūtai
 Kantō Kōkūtai
 Kinki Kōkūtai
 Kyūshū Kōkūtai
 Nagoya Kōkūtai
 Nansei-Shotō Kōkūtai
 Ōryū Kōkūtai
 Tainan Kōkūtai
 Taiwan Kōkūtai
 Tōkai Kōkūtai
 Tsuiki Kōkūtai
 Yokosuka Kōkūtai
 12th Kōkūtai
 121st Kōkūtai
 131st Kōkūtai
 132nd Kōkūtai
 141st Kōkūtai
 151st Kōkūtai
 153rd Kōkūtai
 201st Kōkūtai
 210th Kōkūtai
 252nd Kōkūtai
 302nd Kōkūtai
 352nd Kōkūtai
 501st Kōkūtai
 502nd Kōkūtai
 503rd Kōkūtai
 521st Kōkūtai
 523rd Kōkūtai
 531st Kōkūtai
 541st Kōkūtai
 552nd Kōkūtai
 553rd Kōkūtai
 601st Kōkūtai
 634th Kōkūtai
 652nd Kōkūtai
 653rd Kōkūtai
 701st Kōkūtai
 721st Kōkūtai
 722nd Kōkūtai
 752nd Kōkūtai
 761st Kōkūtai
 762nd Kōkūtai
 763rd Kōkūtai
 765th Kōkūtai
 901st Kōkūtai
 951st Kōkūtai
 1001st Kōkūtai
 1081st Kōkūtai
 Aerial Squadron
 Reconnaissance 3rd Hikōtai
 Reconnaissance 4th Hikōtai
 Reconnaissance 61st Hikōtai
 Reconnaissance 101st Hikōtai
 Reconnaissance 102nd Hikōtai
 Attack 1st Hikōtai
 Attack 3rd Hikōtai
 Attack 5th Hikōtai
 Attack 102nd Hikōtai
 Attack 103rd Hikōtai
 Attack 105th Hikōtai
 Attack 107th Hikōtai
 Attack 161st Hikōtai
 Attack 251st Hikōtai
 Attack 263rd Hikōtai
 Kamikaze
 Chūyū group (picked from Attack 5th Hikōtai)
 Giretsu group (picked from Attack 5th Hikōtai)
 Kasuga group (picked from Attack 5th Hikōtai)
 Chihaya group (picked from 201st Kōkūtai)
 Katori group (picked from Attack 3rd Hikōtai)
 Kongō group No. 6 (picked from 201st Kōkūtai)
 Kongō group No. 9 (picked from 201st Kōkūtai)
 Kongō group No. 11 (picked from 201st Kōkūtai)
 Kongō group No. 23 (picked from 201st Kōkūtai)
 Kyokujitsu group (picked from Attack 102nd Hikōtai)
 Suisei group (picked from Attack 105th Hikōtai)
 Yamato group (picked from Attack 105th Hikōtai)
 Kikusui-Suisei group (picked from Attack 103rd Hikōtai and Attack 105th Hikōtai)
 Kikusui-Suisei group No. 2 (picked from Attack 103rd Hikōtai and Attack 105th Hikōtai)
 Koroku-Suisei group (picked from Attack 103rd Hikōtai)
 Chūsei group (picked from 252nd Kōkūtai and Attack 102nd Hikōtai)
 Mitate group No. 3 (picked from Attack 1st Hikōtai and Attack 3rd Hikōtai)
 Mitate group No. 4 (picked from Attack 1st Hikōtai)
 210th group (picked from 210th Kōkūtai)
 Niitaka group (picked from Attack 102nd Hikōtai)
 Yūbu group (picked from Attack 102nd Hikōtai)

 United States Navy operated captured aircraft for evaluation purposes.

Variants

D4Y1 Experimental Type 13 carrier dive-bomber (十三試艦上爆撃機, 13-Shi Kanjō Bakugekiki)
5 prototypes were produced. #2 and #3 were rebuilt to reconnaissance plane and carried on aircraft carrier Sōryū, and used the Battle of Midway.#4 was rebuilt to reconnaissance plane also, and carried on aircraft carrier Shōkaku, and used the Battle of the Santa Cruz Islands.
D4Y1-C Type 2 reconnaissance aircraft Model 11 (二式艦上偵察機一一型, Nishiki Kanjō Teisatsuki 11-Gata)
Reconnaissance version produced at Aichi's Nagoya factory. Developed on 7 July 1942.
D4Y1 Suisei Model 11 (彗星一一型, Suisei 11-Gata)
First batch of serial produced dive bomber aircraft. Powered by 895 kW (1,200 hp) Aichi AE1A Atsuta 12 engine. Developed in December 1943.
D4Y1 KAI Suisei Model 21 (彗星二一型, Suisei 21-Gata)
D4Y1 with catapult equipment for battleship Ise and Hyūga. Developed on 17 March 1944.
D4Y2 Suisei Model 12 (彗星一二型, Suisei 12-Gata)
1,044 kW (1,400 hp) Aichi AE1P Atsuta 32 engine adopted. Developed in October 1944.
D4Y2a Suisei Model 12A (彗星一二甲型, Suisei 12 Kō-Gata)
D4Y2 with the rear cockpit 13 mm (.51 in) machine gun. Developed in November 1944.
D4Y2-S Suisei Model 12E (彗星一二戊型, Suisei 12 Bo-Gata)
Night fighter version of the D4Y2 with bomb equipment removed and a 20 mm upward-firing cannon installed.
D4Y2 KAI Suisei Model 22 (彗星二二型, Suisei 22-Gata)
D4Y2 with catapult equipment for battleship Ise and Hyūga.
D4Y2a KAI Suisei Model 22A (彗星二二甲型, Suisei 22 Kō-Gata)
D4Y2 KAI with the rear cockpit 13 mm (.51 in) machine gun.
D4Y2-R Type 2 reconnaissance aircraft Model 12 (二式艦上偵察機一二型, Nishiki Kanjō Teisatsuki 12-Gata)
Reconnaissance version of the D4Y2. Developed in October 1944.
D4Y2a-R Type 2 reconnaissance aircraft Model 12A (二式艦上偵察機一二甲型, Nishiki Kanjō Teisatsuki 12 Kō-Gata)
D4Y2-R with the rear cockpit 13 mm (.51 in) machine gun.
D4Y3 Suisei Model 33 (彗星三三型, Suisei 33-Gata)
Land-based bomber variant. 1,163 kW (1,560 hp) Mitsubishi Kinsei 62 radial engine adopted. Removed tailhook also.
D4Y3a Suisei Model 33A (彗星三三甲型, Suisei 33 Kō-Gata)
D4Y3 with the rear cockpit 13 mm (.51 in) machine gun.
D4Y3 Suisei Model 33 night-fighter variant (彗星三三型改造夜戦, Suisei 33-Gata Kaizō yasen)
Temporary rebuilt night-fighter version. Two planes were converted from D4Y3. Equipment a 20 mm upward-firing cannon installed. This was not naval regulation equipment. Development code D4Y3-S (or Suisei Model 33E) was not discovered in the IJN official documents.
D4Y4 Suisei Model 43 (彗星四三型, Suisei 43-Gata)
Final production variant. Bomb load increased to 800 kg (1,760 lb) with the main bomb semi-recessed in the bomb bay. It had 75 mm bullet-proof glass in front of the canopy, plus 5mm and 9mm thick armour plates fore and aft of the cockpit. The fuel tanks were also given added protection, and the movable rear machine gun was removed. The addition of five RATO boosters was considered: three in the lower-bottom part of the fuselage and two on both sides below the engine. Generally, the D4Y4 is often recognized as being purpose-built for special attack operations. 
D4Y5 Suisei Model 54 (彗星五四型, Suisei 54-Gata)
Planned version with Nakajima Homare radial engine, four-blade propeller, and more armor protection.

Surviving aircraft

A restored D4Y1 (serial 4316) is located at the Yasukuni Jinja Yūshūkan shrine in Tokyo.

An engineless D4Y3 was recovered from Babo Airfield, Indonesia in 1991. It was acquired and restored to non-flying status by the Planes of Fame Air Museum in Chino, California. It was restored to represent a radial engined D4Y3, using an American Pratt & Whitney R-1830 engine. The engine is in running condition and can be started to demonstrate ground running and taxiing of the aircraft.

Specifications (D4Y2)

See also

References

Notes

Bibliography
 
 
 Francillon, René J. Japanese Bombers of World War Two, Volume One. Windsor, Berkshire, UK: Hylton Lacy Publishers Ltd., 1969. .
 
 Francillon, René J. Japanese Aircraft of the Pacific War. London: Putnam & Company Ltd., 1979 .
 Gunston, Bill. The Illustrated Encyclopedia of Combat Aircraft of World War II. London: Salamander Books Ltd., 1978. 
 

 "Japan Center for Asian Historical Records (JACAR)." National Archives of Japan
"Aircraft, weapons, and bombs list Himeji Naval Air Base" Japan Center for Asian Historical Records (JACAR) Ref.C08011073400, Flying Corps delivery list 5/14 (National Institute for Defense Studies)
 Reference code: C08011083500, Kyushu Flying Corps (1st Kokubu)
 Reference code: C08011088800, Delivery articles list Osaka Naval Guard Station Office Oi Base, Tokai Naval Flying Corps (1)
 Reference code: C08011214400, Yamato air base (2)
 
 Famous Airplanes Of The World No. 69: Navy Carrier Dive-Bomber "Suisei", Bunrindō (Japan), March 1988. .
 Ishiguro, Ryusuke. Japanese Special Attack Aircraft and Flying Bombs. Tokyo: MMP 2009..
 The Maru Mechanic, Ushio Shobō (Japan)
 No. 15 Nakajima C6N1 Carrier Based Rec. Saiun, March 1979
 No. 27 Naval Aero-Technical Arsenal, Carrier Dive Bomber "Suisei D4Y", March 1981
 Model Art, Model Art Co. Ltd. (Japan)
 No. 406, Special issue Camouflage & Markings of Imperial Japanese Navy Bombers in W.W.II, April 1993.
 No. 595, Special issue Night fighters of the Imperial Japanese Army and Navy, October 2001.
 Richards, M.C. and Donald S. Smith. "Aichi D3A ('Val') & Yokosuka D4Y ('Judy') Carrier Bombers of the IJNAF".  Aircraft in Profile, Volume 13. Windsor, Berkshire, UK: Profile Publications Ltd., 1974, pp. 145–169. .

External links

 Yokosuka D4Y Suisei at World War 2 Warbirds website
 Combined Fleet

D4Y
Carrier-based aircraft
D4Y, Yokosuka
D4Y, Yokosuka
Single-engined tractor aircraft
Mid-wing aircraft
Aircraft first flown in 1940